Ro Alifereti Raivalita Doviverata (born 14 June 1976 in Suva) is a Fijian rugby union footballer.  He plays as a Flanker or a No. 8. His nickname is Dovi.

He is from a chiefly background and his father is one of the chiefs of Rewa. He first played for Fiji in Sevens.  A Fiji schoolboy rep in 1993 and 1995, he first played for the Fiji sevens team in 1996 before spending one season with Redruth in England. He played in the opening two IRB sevens tournaments of the 2000-01 season. He made his debut for Fiji against Spain in 1999. He missed out on the 2001 Rugby World Cup Sevens in Argentina but was picked by the former Italy and at that time coach of Fiji Brad Johnstone to be part of the 1999 Rugby World Cup Fiji team that year. He then earned a regular starting place in the loose forwards under late coach Greg Smith in 2000-01. He took over as national 15s skipper for the November 2001 tour of Europe. Under Mac McCallion, Dovi cemented his place as No. 8, and was named the captain against Tonga in July 2003 and shortly after that he was made captain of the Fiji team to the 2003 Rugby World Cup. He played for and co-captained the Pacific Islanders in their inaugural tour to New Zealand and Australia.

In May 2007, he was chosen to skipper the Fiji team for the 2007 Pacific Nations Cup.

Fiji team
 35 caps 5 tries 25 points (43 games 5 tries)
 Pacific Islanders
 2 caps (4 games)

External links 
 
 

1976 births
Living people
Sportspeople from Suva
Fijian rugby union players
Rugby union flankers
Fiji international rugby union players
Fijian chiefs
Commonwealth Games medallists in rugby sevens
Rugby sevens players at the 1998 Commonwealth Games
Commonwealth Games silver medallists for Fiji
Male rugby sevens players
Commonwealth Games rugby sevens players of Fiji
Medallists at the 1998 Commonwealth Games